Estudiantes de Caracas Sport Club is a Venezuelan professional football club based in Caracas. It was established as a professional team in July 2014, debuting in the Venezuelan Segunda División for the 2014–15 season and earning promotion to the top tier at the end of that season. They play their games at the Estadio Brígido Iriarte.

Its major achievements are a runner-up finish at the end of their debut season in the Segunda División, as well as a championship in the same competition in 2017, and a runner-up finish in the 2016 Copa Venezuela, which allowed them to qualify for the 2017 Copa Sudamericana despite being relegated that same season.

Honours
Venezuelan Segunda División:
Champions (1): 2017
Runners-up (1): 2014–15

Copa Venezuela:
Runners-up (1): 2016

External links
 Official Site 

Football clubs in Venezuela
Association football clubs established in 2014
2014 establishments in Venezuela
Sport in Caracas